Gerardo Rabajda (born 13 August 1967 in Montevideo) is a former Uruguayan football goalkeeper. He played for clubs Peñarol, Unión Española, Puebla FC, Sevilla FC, Rosario Central Danubio F.C., and Centro Atlético Fénix.

External links 
 http://elsevilla.com/articles/29514-que-fue-de-gerardo-rabajda

1967 births
Living people
Uruguayan people of Slavic descent
Uruguayan footballers
Uruguayan expatriate footballers
Footballers from Montevideo
Club Puebla players
Peñarol players
Danubio F.C. players
Unión Española footballers
Rosario Central footballers
Chilean Primera División players
Argentine Primera División players
Liga MX players
Expatriate footballers in Argentina
Expatriate footballers in Chile
Expatriate footballers in Spain
Expatriate footballers in Mexico
Association football goalkeepers